UnityPoint Health (known as Iowa Health System until 2013) is a network of hospitals, clinics and home care services in Iowa, Illinois and Wisconsin. The system began in 1993, when Iowa Lutheran Hospital and Iowa Methodist Hospital in Des Moines merged, forming the state's largest provider of hospital and related health services. The organization grew to encompass eight metropolitan areas and changed its name in 2013 to reflect that it was no longer exclusive to Iowa.

In 2022, UnityPoint Health spun off Methodist, Proctor and Pekin hospitals in Peoria, IL, to nonprofit Carle Health.

Hospitals

See also
 Hospital network

References

External links
 UnityPoint Health official website

 
1993 establishments in Iowa
Hospital networks in the United States